Arsenio Hall (born February 12, 1956) is an American comedian, actor and talk show host. He hosted the late-night talk show, The Arsenio Hall Show, from 1989 until 1994, and again from 2013 to 2014.

He has appeared in Martial Law, Coming to America (1988), Coming 2 America (2021), and Harlem Nights (1989). He was also the host of Star Search and appeared as Alan Thicke's sidekick on the talk show Thicke of the Night.

In 2012, he won NBC's reality-competition game show Celebrity Apprentice 5.

Early years
Hall was born in Cleveland, Ohio, the son of Fred and Annie Hall. His father is a Baptist minister. Hall performed as a magician when he was a child. He graduated from Warrensville Heights High School in Warrensville Heights, Ohio, in 1973, after briefly  attending John F. Kennedy High School. He later attended Ohio University and Kent State University.

Career
Hall later moved to Chicago, and then Los Angeles, to pursue a career in comedy, making a couple of appearances on Soul Train. In 1984, he was the announcer/sidekick for Alan Thicke during the short-lived talk show Thicke of the Night (a role for which he has on occasion noted his confusion with Monty Hall).

He appeared on five weeks of episodes of the short-lived NBC game show Match Game-Hollywood Squares Hour from 1983 to 1984. He was also the original voice of Winston Zeddemore in the animated series The Real Ghostbusters from 1986 to 1987. In 1988, he co-starred in the comedy film Coming to America with Eddie Murphy. During his career, he set up Arsenio Hall Communications in 1987, and then he had signed a two-year, multi-picture agreement with Paramount Pictures to develop films for an exclusive agreement.

Talk shows
In 1986, the Fox network introduced The Late Show Starring Joan Rivers, created to directly challenge The Tonight Show Starring Johnny Carson. After a moderate start, ratings for the show sagged. Relations between Rivers and network executives at Fox quickly eroded, and she left in 1987. The series was subsequently renamed The Late Show, and featured several interim hosts, including Ross Shafer, Suzanne Somers, Shawn Thompson, Richard Belzer and Robert Townsend, before it was canceled in 1988. Hall was also chosen to host the show in the fall of 1987, and his stint proved immensely popular, leading to his being offered his own show in syndication.

From January 2, 1989 to May 27, 1994, he had a Paramount contract to host a nationwide syndicated late night talk show, The Arsenio Hall Show. It was a breakout success, rating especially high among the coveted younger demographic, and known for its audience's distinctive alternative to applause in chanting, "Woof, woof, woof!" (which originated in the Cleveland Browns' Dawg Pound in the east end zone) while pumping their fists. The practice soon became such a ritual that by 1991 it had become a "pop culture stamp of approval"—one that Hall said had become "so popular it's getting on people's nerves". The gesture was so well known that it appeared in films such as Pretty Woman, Passenger 57, Aladdin, and The Hard Way.

He also had a rivalry with Jay Leno after the latter was named host of The Tonight Show, during which Hall said that he would "kick Jay's ass" in ratings.

Hall used his fame during this period to help fight worldwide prejudice against HIV/AIDS after Magic Johnson contracted the virus. Hall and Johnson filmed a public service announcement about the disease that aired in the early 1990s.

Other television and radio work

Between 1988 and 1991, Hall hosted the MTV Video Music Awards. Over the years, he has appeared as a guest on numerous talk shows, in special features, as a voice actor, on game shows and other award shows. Since The Arsenio Hall Show ended, Hall had leading roles on television shows such as the short-lived sitcom Arsenio (1997) and Martial Law with Sammo Hung (1998–2000), and hosted the revival of Star Search (2003–2004). While hosting Star Search, he popularized the catchphrase "Hit me with the digits!"

Hall appeared as himself in Chappelle's Show in March 2004 (convinced by Swedish comedy director Saman Khadiri) when Chappelle was imagining "what Arsenio is doing right now" in a dinner scene. Hall has guest co-hosted Wednesday evenings on The Tim Conway Jr. Show on KLSX 97.1 FM radio.  He hosted MyNetworkTV's comedic web video show The World's Funniest Moments and TV One's 100 Greatest Black Power Moves.<ref>Arsenio Hall Is Back with Two New Shows. November 9, 2008. Retrieved November 12, 2008.</ref> He also appeared on Real Time with Bill Maher in May 2012, in a discussion commemorating the 1992 Los Angeles riots.

Hall was considered the host of the syndicated version of Deal or No Deal and filmed a pilot (there were six taped). However, by the time the syndicated series began on September 8, 2008, Howie Mandel was chosen as host.

Hall also appeared regularly on The Jay Leno Show, and was a guest on Lopez Tonight. George Lopez credits Arsenio as the reason he had a late night show; Lopez appeared on The Arsenio Hall Show more times than any other comedian. Lopez requested Hall be a co-host on Lopez Tonight (November 25, 2009) since he regarded Hall as his inspiration and the first "late night party show host". Hall has filled in as guest host for NBC's Access Hollywood Live (2011) and CNN's evening talk/interview program Piers Morgan Tonight in 2012.

In 2012, Hall was a contestant on the fifth edition of The Celebrity Apprentice, which began airing February 19, 2012. Hall represented his charity, the Magic Johnson Foundation, which is dedicated to advancing economic and social equality by engaging minorities in every aspect of their communities; increasing academic and innovative achievement; and raising HIV/AIDS awareness, treatment and prevention. While Hall clashed with Aubrey O'Day, he befriended a majority of the cast. On May 20, 2012, in the live season finale, he was chosen as the Celebrity Apprentice winner, being "hired" by Donald Trump over the other celebrity finalist, singer Clay Aiken. For winning The Celebrity Apprentice, Hall won the $250,000 grand prize for his charity, in addition to money for the tasks he and his team performed when he was a team leader.

A revival of Hall's syndicated late-night talk show, The Arsenio Hall Show, premiered September 9, 2013, on Tribune owned stations and other networks via CBS Television Distribution. It was canceled after one season due to low ratings. The last taping aired May 30, 2014.

Personal life
In 1997, after being out of the public eye for three years, Hall gave an interview to dispel rumors regarding what had driven him off stage. "I went on the Internet," he said, "and read I was in detox at Betty Ford. I got online under a fake name and typed in, 'I know Arsenio better than anyone else and he's not in detox, you idiots!'"

Hall has one son, born in 1998. Hall says he took time off to raise his son before resuming The Arsenio Hall Show in 2013. Hall had an interest in returning to the business eventually, but his decision was not confirmed until he appeared on Lopez Tonight in 2009 (although he initially considered a weekend show because he did not want to compete in ratings against his friend George Lopez).

On May 5, 2016, Hall filed a $5 million defamation lawsuit against Sinéad O'Connor after she claimed he had fueled Prince's drug habit and had also spiked her drink at a party at Eddie Murphy's house. Hall dropped the lawsuit after O'Connor apologized and retracted her allegations.

Recognition
 1988 NAACP Image Award for Outstanding Supporting Actor in a Motion Picture (Coming to America)
 1989 American Comedy Award for Funniest Supporting Actor in a Motion Picture (Coming to America)
 Hall received an honorary Doctor of Humane Letters degree from Central State University, Wilberforce, Ohio, Spring 1992.

Filmography

Film

Television

Discography

As "Chunky A"
 Large and in Charge'' (1989)

References

Further reading

External links

 
 
 

1956 births
20th-century American male actors
20th-century American comedians
21st-century American comedians
21st-century American male actors
African-American male comedians
African-American male actors
African-American television personalities
African-American television producers
African-American television talk show hosts
American male comedians
American male film actors
American male television actors
American male voice actors
American stand-up comedians
Television producers from Ohio
American television talk show hosts
Comedians from Ohio
Kent State University alumni
Late night television talk show hosts
Living people
Male actors from Cleveland
Ohio University alumni
Participants in American reality television series
Television personalities from Cleveland
Film producers from Ohio
The Apprentice (franchise) winners
20th-century African-American people
21st-century African-American people